Ethiopia is a country located in the Horn of Africa. According to the IMF, Ethiopia was one of the fastest-growing economies in the world, registering over 10% economic growth from 2004 through 2009. It was the fastest-growing non-oil-dependent African economy in the years 2007 and 2008. In 2015, the World Bank highlighted that Ethiopia had witnessed rapid economic growth with real domestic product (GDP) growth averaging 10.9% between 2004 and 2014.

Notable firms 
This list includes notable companies with primary headquarters located in the country. The industry and sector follow the Industry Classification Benchmark taxonomy. Organizations which have ceased operations are included and noted as defunct.

See also 
 List of banks in Ethiopia
 Ambo Mineral Water, an Ethiopian bottled water brand that is popular in the country

References 

 
 
Ethiopia